Handball competition of the 2022 South American Games in Asunción was held from 6 to 15 October at the CEO Centro de Entrenamiento Olímpico. The top two teams in each tournament qualified to the 2023 Pan American Games.

Participating teams

Men

Women

Medal summary

Medal table

Medalists

Men's tournament

All times are local (UTC–3).

Women's tournament

All times are local (UTC–3).

References

External links
 2022 South American Games – Handball

2022 South American Games events
2022
South American Games
Qualification tournaments for the 2023 Pan American Games